Ozerki is a rural locality (a khutor) and the administrative center of Ozerkinskoye Rural Settlement, Kikvidzensky District, Volgograd Oblast, Russia. The population was 589 as of 2010.

Geography 
Ozerki is located on Khopyorsko-Buzulukskaya plain, on the left bank of the Buzuluk River, 13 km northeast of Preobrazhenskaya (the district's administrative centre) by road. Kazarino is the nearest rural locality.

References 

Rural localities in Kikvidzensky District